The  are a Japanese women's softball team based in Matsuyama, Ehime. The Vertz compete in the Japan Diamond Softball League (JD.League) as a member of the league's West Division.

History
The Vertz were founded in 1985, as Iyo Bank softball team.

The Japan Diamond Softball League (JD.League) was founded in 2022, and the Vertz became part of the new league as a member of the West Division.

Roster

References

External links
 
 Iyo Bank Vertz - JD.League
 
 

Japan Diamond Softball League
Women's softball teams in Japan
Sports teams in Ehime Prefecture